The Civil Defense Directorate provides civil defense and emergency services in the Hashemite Kingdom of Jordan. The Directorate was established in 1956, and lies under the jurisdiction of the country's Ministry of Interior.

References

Civil defense
Emergency services in Jordan